Dietes is a genus of rhizomatous plants of the family Iridaceae, first described as a genus in 1866. Common names include wood iris, fortnight lily, African iris, Japanese iris and butterfly iris, each of which may be used differently in different regions for one or more of the six species within the genus.

Most species are native to southern  and central Africa, with one (Dietes robinsoniana) native to Lord Howe Island off the coast of Australia. A few species have become naturalized in other parts of the world.

Taxonomy
These plants were formerly placed in the genus Moraea, but were reclassified because they are rhizomatous. Like Moraea, they differ from Iris in having flowers with six free tepals that are not joined into a tube at their bases.

Some references mention the species Dietes vegeta or D. vegeta variegata, springing from some confusion with Moraea vegata (which grows from a corm, not a rhizome). The name D. vegeta is commonly misapplied to both D. grandiflora or D. iridioides.

The genus name is derived from the Greek words di-, meaning "two", and etes, meaning "affinities".

 Species
 Dietes bicolor (Steud.) Sweet ex Klatt (yellow wild iris, peacock flower, butterfly iris) - Cape Province, KwaZulu-Natal
 Dietes butcheriana Gerstner Cape Province, KwaZulu-Natal
 Dietes flavida Oberm. - South Africa, Eswatini
 Dietes grandiflora  N.E.Br. (wild iris, large wild iris, fairy iris) - Cape Province, KwaZulu-Natal; naturalized in St. Helena, Mauritius, Rodrigues Island in Indian Ocean, Western Australia 
 Dietes iridioides  (L.) Sweet ex Klatt (wild iris, African iris, Cape iris, fortnight lily, morea iris) - widespread from Ethiopia to Cape Province; naturalized in Madeira, Mauritius, Réunion, Hawaii, Jamaica
 Dietes robinsoniana (F.Muell.) Klatt (wedding lily) - Lord Howe Island (part of New South Wales)

Dietes bicolor has cream or yellow flowers. D. grandiflora and D. iridioides both have white flowers marked with yellow and violet, and appear similar in photographs, but they are quite different: those of grandiflora are much larger, last three days, and have dark spots at the base of the outer tepals, while those of iridioides are small, last only one day, and lack the spots. D. grandiflora is also a larger plant overall.

References

External links

Bibliography
 Floridata: Dietes
 Goldblatt, P. (1981) Systematics, physiology and evolution of Dietes (Iridaceae). Annals of the Missouri Botanical Garden 68: 132–153.

Iridaceae genera
Iridaceae